Aaron David Harper (born 20 May 1967) is an Australian politician. He has been the Labor member for Thuringowa in the Queensland Legislative Assembly since 2015.

References

1967 births
Living people
Members of the Queensland Legislative Assembly
Australian Labor Party members of the Parliament of Queensland
21st-century Australian politicians